Chyoryumche (Çörümçe) is a rural locality (a selo) and the administrative center of Chyoryumchinsky Rural Okrug in Verkhoyansky District of the Sakha Republic, Russia, located  from Batagay, the administrative center of the district. Its population as of the 2010 Census was 223; up from 206 recorded in the 2002 Census.

References

Notes

Sources
Official website of the Sakha Republic. Registry of the Administrative-Territorial Divisions of the Sakha Republic. Verkhoyansky District. 

Rural localities in Verkhoyansky District